Melaleuca conothamnoides is a shrub in the myrtle family, Myrtaceae and is endemic to the south-west of Western Australia. It is distinguished by its relatively large leaves, prominent oil glands and unusual bracts covering the flower buds before they open.

Description

The flowers are arranged in heads or short spikes, mostly at the ends of the branches which continue to grow after flowering but sometimes also in the upper leaf axils. The flower buds are covered with overlapping greenish-black bracts. The stamens are in five bundles around the edge of the flower, each bundle containing 7 to 9 purple or pinkish-mauve stamens. The main flowering season is from September to November but has been recorded as early as August and as late as January. After flowering, the fruit develop as roughly spherical or oval groups of woody capsules.

Taxonomy and naming
The specific epithet (conothamnoides) refers to the similarity of this species to one in the genus Conothamnus. The ending -oides is a Latin suffix meaning "resembling" or "having the form of".

Distribution and habitat
This melaleuca is mainly found in sandy and gravelly soils in the drier wheatbelt between Tammin and Morawa in the Avon Wheatbelt, Coolgardie, Geraldton Sandplains, Jarrah Forest, Murchison and Yalgoo biogeographic regions.

Conservation status
Melaleuca conothamoides is listed as "not threatened" by the Government of Western Australia Department of Parks and Wildlife.

References

cuticularis
Myrtales of Australia
Rosids of Western Australia
Plants described in 1964
Endemic flora of Western Australia